Silvia Abril Fernández (Mataró, 10 April 1971) is a Spanish comedian, actress and TV host.

Biography
Abril was born in Mataró, Barcelona, and she has three sisters: Meritxell (1986), Mónica (1973) and Anabel. She is married to comedian Andreu Buenafuente, and their child, Joana, was born on 28 November 2012.

Career
She is best known for her roles in hit Spanish series La que se avecina as Violeta Recio, Spanish Movie as Laura, and as one of the dancers for the Spanish entry at the Eurovision Song Contest 2008, "Baila el Chiki-chiki".

On 19 September 2017 she participated at the second season of MasterChef Celebrity with Bibiana Fernández, Pepón Nieto, Marina San José, Anabel Alonso, Patricia Montero, Edu Soto, José Corbacho, Usun Yoon, Juan Betancourt, Saúl Craviotto and Carlos Baute. She was the fourth contestant eliminated, but she was brought back in the next episode, and she finally was the runner-up.

Abril is the panelist of the television show Cero en Historia alongside Raúl Cimas, Sara Escudero and J.J. Vaquero, which is presented by Joaquín Reyes. In the season 3 episode 14 Silvia Abril was replaced by Anabel Alonso due to health problems. He was replaced by Patricia Conde in the fourth season.

She hosted the 33rd Goya Awards  with Andreu Buenafuente on 2 February 2019. She appeared in the comedy film Bajo el mismo techo (2019), starring with Jordi Sánchez.

Filmography

Film
 2019: Padre no hay más que uno
 2019: Bajo el mismo techo
 2016: Cuerpo de élite
 2016: Un corazón roto no es como un jarrón roto o un florero
 2015: Anacleto: agente secreto
 2015: Vulcania
 2014: El culo del mundo
 2014: Torrente 5: Operación Eurovegas
 2013: Three Many Weddings
 2012: Ghost Graduation
 2011: Torrente 4: Lethal Crisis
 2010: Toy Story 3 (Spain voice acting)
 2009: Spanish Movie
 2006:  El Juglar da la nota
 2005: Torrente 3: El protector
 2003: Lo mejor que le puede pasar a un cruasán
 2003: ¡Buen viaje, excelencia!

Television
 2019–present: Juego de juegos
 2019: 33rd Goya Awards
 2018: La noche de Rober
 2017: Hipnotízame
 2017: MasterChef Celebrity (contestant)
 2017–present: Cero en Historia
 2017: Tú sí que sí
 2016–present: Late Motiv
 2016: 3rd award ceremony of Premios Feroz
 2016: ¡Eso lo hago yo!
 2015 – 2016: Tu cara me suena
 2014: 39+1
 2013: Oh Happy Day!
 2013: En el aire
 2013 – 2015: Me resbala
 2008 & 2011–2014: La que se avecina
 2012: Buenas noches y Buenafuente
 2011: Palomitas
 2011: El Hormiguero
 2011: Las noticias de las 2
 2010: La escobilla nacional
 2010: Caiga Quien Caiga
 2010: Pelotas
 2008: Eurovision Song Contest 2008
 2008 – 2009: Buenafuente
 2006: Divinos
 2004 – 2005: Las cerezas
 2003 – 2007, 2017–present: Homo Zapping

References

External links 

 

1971 births
Living people
21st-century Spanish actresses
Spanish television actresses
Spanish television presenters
Spanish women television presenters